Rajeswari Vaidyanathan is a Tedx Speaker, trainer, performer and a choreographer of International Latin Ballroom Dance forms. She is the founder of a dance school called VR DanceSport, which is the largest Latin Ballroom dance school in India providing International level social and competitive training.

Early life
Vaidyanathan is from Kolkata. She has done her post graduation from ICFAI Business School. She has also done Honours in English from Loreto College under Calcutta University.

Career
Vaidyanathan was a senior vice president at Yes Bank.She has also worked in ICICI bank, Citibank, Kotak Mahindra Bank. She is a trainer in Latin Ballroom Dance forms. She is the founder of VR DanceSport which pioneered International Latin Ballroom in India. She has also brought World Dance Council to India and hosted the largest national level Latin Ballroom dance championship in India 2015–2017. 2018 she became the Indian Ambassador to Freedom to Dance, UK. She provides International level training in various dance forms like Salsa, Bachata, ChaCha, Jive, Samba, Argentine Tango, Rumba, Waltz. She has Choreographed in 2016 Hindi film Befikre and 2020 web series 
A Suitable Boy

As Choreographer
Befikre
A Suitable Boy
The Good Karma Hospital

Awards
 Gold & Silver Medalists in International dancesport Competitions

References

Indian dancers
Living people
Indian film choreographers
Year of birth missing (living people)